Nils E. Svärd (July 10, 1908 in Östersund, Jämtland – August 6, 2001) was a Swedish cross-country skier who competed in the early 1930s.

He won a bronze in the 18 km event at the 1931 FIS Nordic World Ski Championships.

At the 1932 Winter Olympics he finished tenth in the 18 km event.

Cross-country skiing results
All results are sourced from the International Ski Federation (FIS).

Olympic Games

World Championships
 1 medal – (1 bronze)

References

External links

1908 births
2001 deaths
People from Östersund
Cross-country skiers from Jämtland County
Swedish male cross-country skiers
Olympic cross-country skiers of Sweden
Cross-country skiers at the 1932 Winter Olympics
FIS Nordic World Ski Championships medalists in cross-country skiing